Thiago Benevides Gonçalves, commonly known as Thiaguinho (born September 4, 1987), is a Brazilian footballer who plays for Spanish club CD Ferriolense as a left winger.

Club career
Born in Niterói, Rio de Janeiro, Thiaguinho graduated from Fluminense Football Club's youth setup. However, he failed to appear in the first-team squad, and was subsequently loaned to Série C side Duque de Caxias Futebol Clube in 2008. With the latter he appeared regularly, scoring once.

In 2009 Thiaguinho moved to Olaria Atlético Clube. After  seasons with the club, he moved abroad for the first time in his career, joining Segunda División B's CD Atlético Baleares. In July 2011 he renewed his link with the Balearic side, becoming a regular starter afterwards.

On 20 July 2014 Thiaguinho joined Racing de Ferrol, also in the third level. On 22 January of the following year he rescinded with the club, after appearing in only ten league matches.

References

External links

1987 births
Living people
Sportspeople from Niterói
Brazilian footballers
Association football wingers
Campeonato Brasileiro Série C players
Fluminense FC players
Duque de Caxias Futebol Clube players
Segunda División B players
Tercera División players
CD Atlético Baleares footballers
Racing de Ferrol footballers
Brazilian expatriate footballers
Brazilian expatriate sportspeople in Spain
Expatriate footballers in Spain
CD Llosetense players